Pexicopia is a genus of moths in the family Gelechiidae. It contains 22 species, such as the hollyhock seed moth (Pexicopia malvella), which is found in Europe.

Species
 Pexicopia arenicola Common, 1958
 Pexicopia catharia Common, 1958
 Pexicopia cryphia Common, 1958
 Pexicopia dascia Common, 1958
 Pexicopia desmanthes (Lower, 1898)
 Pexicopia diasema Common, 1958
 Pexicopia dictyomorpha (Lower, 1900)
 Pexicopia epactaea (Meyrick, 1904)
 Pexicopia euryanthes (Meyrick, 1922)
 Pexicopia karachiella Amsel, 1968
 Pexicopia malvella (Hübner, [1805]) (hollyhock seed moth)
 Pexicopia melitolicna (Meyrick, 1935)
 Pexicopia mimetica Common, 1958
 Pexicopia nephelombra (Meyrick, 1904)
 Pexicopia paliscia Common, 1958
 Pexicopia pheletes Common, 1958
 Pexicopia proselia Common, 1958
 Pexicopia pycnoda (Lower, 1899)
 Pexicopia trimetropis (Meyrick, 1922)

Former species
 Pexicopia bathropis
 Pexicopia chalcotora 
 Pexicopia lutarea 
 Pexicopia plinthodes

References

External links
 Funet.fi
 Microlepidoptera.nl 

 
Pexicopiini
Moths of Europe